Manel Bosch Bifet (born September 19, 1967, in Lleida) was a Spanish professional basketball player.

Player career 
1982/83  Maristes Lleida (youth team)
1983/84  Antorcha
1984/85  UE Lleida
1985/89  Espanyol
1989/90  Gijón Baloncesto
1990/91  Granollers
1991/92  CAI Zaragoza
1992/95  Unicaja Málaga
1995/97  FC Barcelona
1997/99  Caja San Fernando
1999/01  Cantabria Lobos
2001/03  Caprabo Lleida

Honours 
FC Barcelona

ACB Champion: 2
1996, 1997

Plus Pujol Lleida

ACB Catalan League Champion: 1
2002

Spain

Eurobasket Bronze Medal: 1
1991

External links
Manel Bosch profile

1967 births
Living people
Basketball players from Catalonia
Baloncesto Málaga players
Real Betis Baloncesto players
FC Barcelona Bàsquet players
Liga ACB players
Sportspeople from Lleida
Spanish men's basketball players
1990 FIBA World Championship players
Gijón Baloncesto players
Forwards (basketball)